Maria das Graças Carvalho Dantas (born 21 May 1969), known as Maria Dantas, is a Brazilian-Spanish activist and politician who serves as Member of the Congress of Deputies of Spain.

Early life
Dantas was born on 21 May 1969 in Aracaju in north-eastern Brazil. She is the daughter of a merchant and a nurse. She has a degree in law from the Federal University of Sergipe. She was a student of Carlos Ayres Britto at the university.

Dantas worked as a deputy delegate for the civil police in Sergipe.

Career
Dantas migrated to Spain 1994 in order to study in environmental law. She was an undocumented migrant and worked in various jobs over 15 years – as a maid, nanny, old age carer, dog walker, waitress and Portuguese teacher. She would clean toilets after attending doctorate classes. She later worked  as an administrative assistant for a finance company. She is a naturalised Spanish citizen.

Soon after arriving in Spain Dantas became an activist against xenophobia, racism, fascism and homophobia and supporting immigration and human rights. She is a member of Unity Against Fascism and Racism (Unitat Contra el Feixisme i el Racisme) and is a member of the boards of Centre Internacional Escarré per a les Minories Ètniques i Nacionals (CIEMEN) and Confederació d’Associacions Veïnals de Catalunya (CONFAVC). Her activism has led to death threats from supporters of Brazil's far-right president Jair Bolsonaro.

Dantas contested the 2019 general election as a Republican Left of Catalonia–Sovereigntists electoral alliance candidate in the Province of Barcelona and was elected to the Congress of Deputies.

Personal life
Dantas has a son, Thiago Lee, from a marriage when she was living in Brazil. She also has two daughters born in Barcelona, Victoria and Natalia, from a second relationship to a Brazilian.

Electoral history

References

External links

1969 births
Activists from Catalonia
Women politicians from Catalonia
Brazilian emigrants to Spain
Federal University of Sergipe alumni
Living people
Members of the 13th Congress of Deputies (Spain)
People from Aracaju
Republican Left of Catalonia politicians
Women members of the Congress of Deputies (Spain)
Members of the 14th Congress of Deputies (Spain)